GAS Petrol Service Stations (stylised g.a.s.), owned by Gasoline Alley Services, is a New Zealand petrol station franchise, which sells petrol and diesel. It has 127 locations around New Zealand, including 33 in Auckland.

The franchise was established in 1999 and had 14 locations by 2000. It had 35 outlets by 2003. The brand expanded to 75 locations by 2006, and 120 locations by 2011.

The head office of the franchise is located in Kingsland, Auckland.

References

External links
 Official website

Automotive fuel retailers
Oil and gas companies of New Zealand
New Zealand companies established in 1994
Retail companies established in 1994